Cancer imaging may refer to:

Medical imaging in humans
Preclinical imaging in animal models of research
Cancer Imaging, an academic journal published by the International Cancer Imaging Society